Events from the year 1428 in France

Incumbents
 Monarch – Charles VII

Events
 12 October – English forces begin the siege of Orléans during the Hundred Years War

Births
 2 November – Yolande, Duchess of Lorraine, ruler of Lorraine (died 1483)
 August – Radegonde of Valois, French Princess (died 1445)

Deaths
 6 November – Guillaume Fillastre, Cardinal (born 1348)

References

1420s in France